Alexandre Kamenka (1888–1969) was a Russian-born French film producer. He was born the son of Boris Kamenka in Odessa, now in Ukraine. At that time the city was part of the Russian Empire. He fled following the Russian Revolution and went to France where he established the production company Films Albatros. A number of other Russian exiles were involved with the company.

Selected filmography
 Kean (1924)
 Carmen (1926)
 The Porter from Maxim's (1927)
 The Italian Straw Hat (1928)
 Two Timid Souls (1928)
 Cagliostro (1929)
 Antoinette (1932)
 The Messenger (1937)
 The Bouquinquant Brothers (1947)
 The Barton Mystery (1949)
 Guilty? (1951)

References

Bibliography
 Andrew, Dudley. Mists of Regret: Culture and Sensibility in Classic French Film. Princeton University Press, 1995.

External links

1888 births
1969 deaths
Russian film producers
French film producers
Ukrainian film producers
Film people from Odesa
Emigrants from the Russian Empire to France
People who emigrated to escape Bolshevism